This is a list of power stations in Prince Edward Island, Canada.

Prince Edward Island has eight power stations, and is the only Canadian province without an active hydroelectric power station (the last one ended commercial operation in the 1950s). The province is largely dependent on imported power from NB Power generation facilities in New Brunswick. Two submarine power lines provide more than 80% of the provincial load. Since the early 2000, the Island has promoted the province as an ideal location for developing wind farms.

Maritime Electric, a subsidiary of St. John's-based Fortis Inc., operates the integrated public utility serving most of the province, with the exception of the City of Summerside which has had a municipal electric utility in operation since 1920; the City of Summerside Electric Utility purchases power from sources such as NB Power that is transmitted to the city through Maritime Electric's network. Both utilities own and operate generating stations (mostly diesel but the largest operated by Maritime Electric uses heavy fuel oil); these plants are used as peakers or during emergencies.

Wind 

List of all wind farms in Prince Edward Island.

Fossil fuel

Notes and references

See also 
 Maritime Electric
 Electricity sector in Canada
 List of power stations in Canada

Lists of power stations in Canada